Filet of Soul is an American folk-rock band from Athens and Atlanta, GA.

Band
The band was formed in 1996 by brothers Adam Beadles and Greg Beadles. Adam is the band's lead vocalist, with Greg the principal songwriter. Shortly after formation, the band was joined by drummer Cornelius Freeman and bassist Seth Cain and they released their first EP, The King Street Demos. Just over a year later, in early 1998, the current lineup was completed when Randy Chester was added.

In November 1998, the band released its debut album, Incommunicado.

Incommunicado
Incommunicado was released on November 3, 1998.

Track Listing
away
copperpot
point of view
gravity
these times
lower me
about the rain
sebastien
POV (reprise)
broken mirror
freight train

References

External links
Shank Records Official Site
Filet of Soul Official Site

Indie rock musical groups from Georgia (U.S. state)
Musical groups established in 1996